Flamman (meaning The Flame in English), also known as Norrskensflamman (meaning The Flame of the Aurora Borealis in English), is a Swedish socialist newspaper.

History and profile
Flamman was founded in 1906 by the workers in Malmfälten and was the regional newspaper of the Swedish Social Democratic Workers' Party. The circulation of the paper reached its peak in the 1920s, with 11,000 daily copies.

After the Social Democratic Party was divided in 1917, the newspaper became a regional organ of the Swedish Social Democratic Left Party (SSV) in Norrbotten County, and later the Swedish Communist Party (SKP). When the Communist Party split in 1977, the newspaper became the voice for the Workers Party - The Communists (APK). In 1989, it changed from being a daily to a weekly newspaper.  In 1990, the newspaper broke with APK and became an independent socialist weekly.

The paper was originally named Norrskensflamman (The Flame of Northern Lights), before a change of name in 1998.

Flamman is based in Stockholm and Emil Persson is among its editors.

The 1940 arson attack
On the night of 3 March 1940, an arson attack was made against the offices of Norrskensflamman in Luleå. The attack was the biggest political attack during the 1900s and considered a terrorist attack. Five persons were killed, including two children, and another five persons were injured. The newspaper's offices were completely destroyed. It was carried out by Ebbe Hallberg, Uno Svanbom, a military captain, three other officers, as well as Gunnar Hedenström, a journalist from the right-wing newspaper, Norrbottens-Kuriren. The attack was planned in the offices of Norrbottens-Kuriren.

The arson attack had financial support from Andreas Lindblom, manager of Skansen, and Paul Wretlind, chairman of the Stockholm section of the Liberal People's Party.

References

External links
Flammans official website

1906 establishments in Sweden
Arson in Sweden
Communist newspapers published in Sweden
Newspapers established in 1906
Newspapers published in Stockholm
Socialist newspapers
Swedish-language newspapers
Weekly newspapers published in Sweden